Elbow pain is a discomfort located in the elbow, as the name explicitly states. The most common cause of elbow pain is inflamed tissues in the region. A common treatment is physical therapy. Symptoms may worsen when the inflamed elbow is not used for a great period of time. Painkillers can also assist with healing.

References

Elbow
Pain